Lewis David Mansell (born 20 September 1997) is an English professional footballer who plays as a striker for  Ramsbottom United.

Club career

Blackburn Rovers
Born in Burnley, Mansell began his career with Blackburn Rovers, moving on loan to F.C. United of Manchester in September 2018.

Mansell went on loan to Scottish club Partick Thistle in January 2019. Mansell scored his first goal for Partick Thistle in his final appearance for the club on the last day of the 2018–19 season, opening the scoring in a 3–0 win over Queen of The South, a result which confirmed Thistle's safety in the Scottish Championship and guided the team to a sixth-place finish.

Partick Thistle
Blackburn confirmed on 15 May 2019 that Mansell would leave at the end of his contract. He subsequently returned to Scotland and signed a two-year contract with Partick Thistle. Mansell scored his first goal of the 2019–20 season in a 3–1 away win at Dundee. Mansell was meant to go out on loan from Thistle, however struggled with injury from December to February. Mansell scored on his first game back from injury for Thistle in a 2–1 loss to Raith Rovers in the Challenge Cup semi final.

Mansell was voted into the 2019–20 Scottish Championship Team of the Season, with the forward beating top scorer Lawrence Shankland in the best striker position, despite having scored one goal during the campaign.

Mansell left Thistle by mutual consent in September 2020, having made 33 appearances, scoring three times over the space of his two spells at the club.

Accrington Stanley
On 6 November 2020, Mansell joined Accrington Stanley on a one-year deal. He scored on his debut for Stanley on 10 November 2020 in an EFL Trophy group game against Barrow. On 7 January 2021, Mansell joined National League side FC Halifax Town on a one-month loan deal. He moved on loan to Southport in February 2022. Mansell was released by Accrington at the end of the 2021–22 season.

Ramsbottom United
On March 18 2023, Mansell signed for  club Ramsbottom United.

International career
He has been called-up to Welsh youth team training camps.

Career statistics

Honours
Individual
SPFL Scottish Championship Team of The Year 2019–20

References

1997 births
Living people
English footballers
Blackburn Rovers F.C. players
F.C. United of Manchester players
Partick Thistle F.C. players
Accrington Stanley F.C. players
FC Halifax Town players
Southport F.C. players
Scottish Professional Football League players
Association football forwards
English Football League players
National League (English football) players
English people of Welsh descent
Ramsbottom United F.C. players